The golden-eyed gecko (Strophurus trux) is a species of lizard in the family Diplodactylidae. The species is endemic to Australia.

Geographic range
S. trux is found in central Queensland, Australia.

References

Further reading
Vanderduys E (2017). "A new species of gecko (Squamata: Diplodactylidae: Strophurus) from central Queensland Australia". Zootaxa 4347 (2): 316–330. (Strophurus trux, new species).

Strophurus
Reptiles described in 2017
Taxa named by Eric P. Vanderduys
Geckos of Australia
Reptiles of Queensland